This is a list of South Korean films of 1978.

References

External links
1978 in South Korea

 1970-1979 at www.koreanfilm.org

1978
South Korean
1978 in South Korea